Emmanuel Baba (born May 22, 1985) is a former Nigerian football player, he last played for Smouha in Egypt.

Career 
In 2002, he played for PFC Cherno More Varna. In 2003 moved to Levski Sofia. In 2007, he played for PFC Spartak Varna.

International career 
He played with the Nigerian U-17 national team in the 2001 FIFA U-17 World Championship and won the bronze medal.

Titles 
 2001 FIFA U-17 World Championship  (Bronze Medal)

References

External links 
 Profile at LevskiSofia.info

Nigerian footballers
Association football midfielders
Nigerian expatriate footballers
PFC Levski Sofia players
PFC Cherno More Varna players
PFC Spartak Varna players
Expatriate footballers in Bulgaria
1985 births
Living people
Nigerian expatriate sportspeople in Bulgaria
First Professional Football League (Bulgaria) players
Jigawa Golden Stars F.C. players